The 1904 Drake Bulldogs football team was an American football team that represented Drake University as an independent during the 1904 college football season. In its second season under head coach W. J. Monilaw, the team compiled a 5–4 record and outscored opponents by a total of 213 to 165.

The team played its home games at Haskins Field. The stadium was dedicated by Governor Albert B. Cummins on October 8, 1904.

Schedule

References

Drake
Drake Bulldogs football seasons
Drake Bulldogs football